Paul McDermott (born 1959) is an Irish judge who currently serves as a Judge of the High Court.

Early life 
McDermott attended University College Dublin and the King's Inns.

Legal career 
He became a barrister in 1980 and subsequently became a senior counsel in 1999. His practice was primarily focused on criminal law. He was counsel for the Morris Tribunal, which addressed allegations against the Garda Síochána. He received €3.2 million in fees, which was the highest amount paid to any of the tribunal's lawyers.

He is the author of legal texts on the Misuse of Drugs Act and the law of prisons in Ireland.

Judicial career 
McDermott was appointed to the High Court in June 2012. He has presided over cases affecting several areas of law, including judicial review, company law, personal injuries, extradition, medical negligence, and homicide trials. He was the presiding judge in the trial surrounding the murder of Ana Kriégel.

As of 2021, he is the judge in charge of several High Court lists including the Central Criminal Court, Special Criminal Court, Extradition, Criminal Assets Bureau and Bail lists.

References 

Living people
High Court judges (Ireland)
Alumni of University College Dublin
1959 births
Irish barristers
Alumni of King's Inns